Hume Blake Cronyn Jr. OC (July 18, 1911 – June 15, 2003) was a Canadian-American actor and writer.

Early life 

Cronyn, one of five children, was born in London, Ontario, Canada. His father, Hume Blake Cronyn, Sr., was a businessman and a Member of Parliament for London (after whom the Hume Cronyn Memorial Observatory at Western University, then known as The University of Western Ontario and asteroid (12050) Humecronyn are named). His mother, Frances Amelia (née Labatt), was an heiress of the brewing company of the same name; as the daughter of John Labatt and the granddaughter of John Kinder Labatt. Cronyn's paternal great-grandfather, Right Reverend Benjamin Cronyn, an Anglican cleric of the Anglo-Irish Protestant Ascendancy, served as the first bishop of the Anglican diocese of Huron and founded Huron College, from which grew the University of Western Ontario.

His great-uncle, Benjamin, Jr., was both a prominent citizen and early mayor of London, Ontario, but was later indicted for fraud and fled to Vermont. During his tenure in London, he built a mansion called Oakwood, which currently serves as the head office of the Info-Tech Research Group. Cronyn was also a cousin of Canadian-born theater producer, Robert Whitehead, and a first cousin of the Canadian-British artist Hugh Verschoyle Cronyn GM (1905–1996).

Cronyn was the first Elmwood School boarder in Ottawa (at the time Elmwood was called Rockliffe Preparatory School) and boarded at Elmwood between 1917 and 1921. After leaving Elmwood, Cronyn went to Ridley College in St. Catharines, and McGill University in Montreal, where he became a member of The Kappa Alpha Society. Early in life, Cronyn was an amateur featherweight boxer, having the skills to be nominated for Canada's 1932 Olympic Boxing team.

Career 

Subsequent to graduating from Ridley College, Cronyn switched majors, from pre-law to drama, while attending McGill University, and continued his acting studies thereafter, under Max Reinhardt and at the American Academy of Dramatic Arts. In 1934, the same year he joined The Lambs, he made his Broadway debut as a janitor in Hipper's Holiday and became known for his versatility, playing a number of different roles on stage. He won a Drama Desk Special Award in 1986. In 1990, he was awarded the National Medal of Arts.

His first Hollywood film was Alfred Hitchcock's Shadow of a Doubt (1943). He later appeared in Hitchcock's Lifeboat (1944) and worked on the screenplays of Rope (1948) and Under Capricorn (1949). He was nominated for an Academy Award for Best Supporting Actor for his performance in The Seventh Cross (1944) and won a Tony Award for his performance as Polonius opposite Richard Burton's Hamlet (1964). Cronyn bought the screenplay What Nancy Wanted from Norma Barzman, who was later blacklisted with her husband Ben Barzman, with the idea of producing the film and starring Tandy. However, he sold the screenplay to RKO which later filmed it as The Locket (1946). Cronyn also made appearances in television, The Barbara Stanwyck Show, the Alfred Hitchcock Presents episode "Kill With Kindness" (1956) and Hawaii Five-O episodes "Over Fifty? Steal" (1970) and "Odd Man In" (1971).

Cronyn had an association with the Stratford Festival as a member of both the acting company and its board of governors. He played Shylock in The Merchant of Venice in 1976, and debuted his play Foxfire in 1980. The play would later move to Broadway (and won Tandy a Best Actress Tony award), and a film version was made in 1987.

In 1990 he won an Emmy award for his role in the TV Movie Age Old Friends.

Marriages and family 
Cronyn's first marriage was to the philanthropist Emily Woodruff in late 1934 or early 1935. They shared a "lavender marriage" and never lived together. Woodruff insisted that the marriage remain a secret because of her lesbian relationships. They quietly divorced in 1936.

Cronyn married the actress Jessica Tandy in 1942, and appeared with her in many of their more memorable dramatic stage, film and television outings, including The Green Years (1946), The Seventh Cross (1944), The Gin Game (1977), Foxfire (1987), The World According to Garp (1982), Cocoon (1985), *batteries not included (1987), Cocoon: The Return (1988), To Dance with the White Dog (1993) and  Camilla (1994).

The couple starred in a short-lived (1953–1954) radio series, The Marriage (based on their earlier Broadway play, The Fourposter), playing New York attorney Ben Marriott and his wife, former fashion buyer Liz, struggling with her switch to domestic life and their raising an awkward teenage daughter (future soap opera star Denise Alexander). The show was scheduled to move from radio to television, with Cronyn producing as well as acting in the show. However, Tandy suffered a miscarriage and the show's debut was delayed a week. The series, which was the first situation comedy broadcast in color, premiered in July 1954 to "warm and enthusiastic reviews"; eight episodes were aired.

The couple had a daughter, Tandy, and a son, Christopher. Cronyn and Tandy lived in the Bahamas, then at a lakeside estate in Pound Ridge, New York, and, finally, in Easton, Connecticut. Jessica Tandy died in 1994, aged 85, from ovarian cancer.

After he was widowed, Cronyn married author/playwright Susan Cooper (with whom he had co-written Foxfire) in July 1996. His 1991 autobiography, which covered his life and career up to the mid-1960s, was titled A Terrible Liar. His intention to write a second volume never materialized.  Cronyn died on June 15, 2003, from prostate cancer, one month before his 92nd birthday.

Honours 
In 1979, Cronyn was inducted into the American Theater Hall of Fame. On July 11, 1988, he was appointed as an Officer of the Order of Canada, giving him the post nominal letters "OC" for life.

Cronyn was inducted into Canada's Walk of Fame in 1999. He also received the 125th Anniversary of the Confederation of Canada Medal in 1992 and the Canadian version of the Queen Elizabeth II Golden Jubilee Medal in 2002.

He was awarded an Honorary Doctor of Laws degree (LLD) by the University of Western Ontario on October 26, 1974. His wife, Jessica Tandy, was given the same degree on the same day.

Filmography

Film

Television

Stage 

 Hipper's Holiday – 1934
 High Tor – 1937
 There's Always a Breeze – 1938
 Escape This Night – 1938
 Off to Buffalo – 1939
 Three Sisters – 1939
 The Weak Link – 1940
 Retreat to Pleasure – 1940
 Mr. Big – 1941
 Portrait of a Madonna – 1946 (Director)
 The Survivors – 1948
 Now I Lay Me Down to Sleep – 1950
 Hilda Crane – 1950
 The Little Blue Light – 1951
 The Fourposter – 1951
 The Honeys – 1955
 A Day by the Sea – 1955
 The Egghead – 1957
 The Man in the Dog Suit – 1958
 Triple Play – 1959
 Big Fish, Little Fish – 1961
 Hamlet – 1964 (Tony Award for role of Polonius)
 The Physicists – 1964
 Slow Dance on the Killing Ground – 1964
 A Delicate Balance – 1966
 Promenade, All! – 1972
 Noël Coward in Two Keys – 1974
 The Gin Game – 1977 (performed, produced)
 Foxfire – 1982 (performed, wrote play and lyrics)
 The Petition – 1986

Radio appearances

References

External links 

 
 
 
 Hume Cronyn at Virtual History
 Order of Canada Citation
 
 Hume Cronyn – Internet Accuracy Project
 Katharine Cronyn Harley fonds (R11163) at Library and Archives Canada. The fonds includes many records related to Hume Cronyn and Jessica Tandy.

1911 births
2003 deaths
Canadian male film actors
Canadian emigrants to the United States
Canadian male stage actors
Canadian male television actors
Canadian male voice actors
Canadian people of English descent
Canadian people of Irish descent
Outstanding Performance by a Lead Actor in a Miniseries or Movie Primetime Emmy Award winners
Outstanding Performance by a Supporting Actor in a Miniseries or Movie Primetime Emmy Award winners
Kennedy Center honorees
McGill University alumni
Officers of the Order of Canada
Male actors from London, Ontario
Deaths from prostate cancer
Tony Award winners
United States National Medal of Arts recipients
Deaths from cancer in Connecticut
20th-century Canadian male actors
People with acquired American citizenship
People from Pound Ridge, New York
People from Easton, Connecticut
Ridley College alumni
Special Tony Award recipients